Rio Trombetas Biological Reserve is a federally-administered biological reserve in the municipality of Oriximiná, Pará, Brazil.
It covers a large area of Amazon biome including rainforest, wetlands and water.

History

It is managed by the Chico Mendes Institute for Biodiversity Conservation.
The objective is to fully preserve the biota and other natural attributes of the reserve without human interference except for recovery of degraded ecosystems and actions to preserve the natural balance, biological diversity and natural ecological processes. A specific objective is to ensure survival of the Arrau turtle (Podocnemis expansa) and other turtles, and to preserve a sample of the Amazon ecosystem.
It adjoins the Trombetas State Forest to the north, the Faro State Forest to the east and the Saracá-Taquera National Forest to the south.

Environment

The reserve is in the Uatuma-Trombetas moist forests ecoregion.
It contains exposed rock from an ancient craton and sediments from the Amazon.
86% of the reserve is covered by upland rainforests, 6% by flooding forests and 6.5% by water.
The area is drained by the Acapu River and the Arrozal, Candieiro, Mungubal and Cabeceira Grande streams.
Numerous lakes in the floodplain are permanently connected to the Trombetas River, forming a large wetland.

The diverse plant species include manilkara huberi, caryocar, dipteryx odorata, chrysophyllum, goupia glabra, copaiba, bertholletia excelsa, anacardium giganteum and palms such as attalea maripa, oenocarpus bacaba and astrocaryum vulgare.
Migratory bird species include osprey (pandion haliaetus), collared plover (charadrius collaris) and large-billed tern (phaetusa simplex).
The glossy antshrike (sakesphorus luctuosus) is endemic.

Status

The Biological Reserve is a "strict nature reserve" under IUCN protected area category Ia.
Since 2002 management of the Rio Trombetas Biological Reserve and the Saracá-Taquera National Forest, which is adjacent to the south, has been combined.
The conservation unit is supported by the Amazon Region Protected Areas Program.
Protected species include giant anteater (myrmecophaga tridactyla), giant armadillo (priodontes maximus), giant otter (pteronura brasiliensis) and Amazonian manatee (trichechus inunguis).

References

Sources

1979 establishments in Brazil
Biological reserves of Brazil
Protected areas of Pará
Protected areas established in 1979